Himalia may refer to:
Himalia (moon), a moon of Jupiter
Himalia group
Himalia (mythology), a nymph from Cyprus in Greek mythology
Himalia Ridge, a ridge on the Ganymede Heights massif on Alexander Island, Antarctica

See also
Himalaya (disambiguation)